Erich Uelmen (born May 19, 1996) is an American professional baseball pitcher for the Philadelphia Phillies of Major League Baseball (MLB). He previously played in MLB for the Chicago Cubs.

Amateur career
Uelmen attended Faith Lutheran High School in Las Vegas, Nevada, where he played baseball. In 2014, his senior year, he earned All-State honors after going 9–1 with a 1.19 ERA, striking out 89 batters over  innings alongside batting .510. Undrafted in the 2014 Major League Baseball draft, he enrolled at California Polytechnic State University where he played college baseball.

In 2015, Uelmen's freshman year at Cal Poly, he appeared in 16 games (making one start) in which he went 0–1 with a 7.08 ERA over twenty innings. That summer, he played in the Northwoods League with the Eau Claire Express. As a sophomore at Cal Poly in 2016, Uelmen went 5–3 with a 3.68 ERA, striking out seventy over 93 innings. Following the season, he played in the Cape Cod Baseball League for the Yarmouth-Dennis Red Sox, going 2–1 with a 4.87 ERA over twenty innings. In 2017, his junior season, he pitched to a 4–8 record with a 2.93 ERA over 15 starts, earning Big West Conference Second Team honors. After the season, he was selected by the Chicago Cubs in the fourth round of the 2017 Major League Baseball draft.

Professional career

Chicago Cubs
Uelmen signed with the Cubs and made his professional debut with the Eugene Emeralds of the Class A Short Season Northwest League, compiling a 2.04 ERA over  innings. In 2018, he began the season with the South Bend Cubs of the Class A Midwest League before being promoted to the Myrtle Beach Pelicans of the Class A-Advanced Carolina League in June. Over 21 games (twenty starts) between the two teams, he went 8–8 with a 3.83 ERA, striking out 82 over  innings. Uelmen returned to Myrtle Beach to begin the 2019 season before earning a promotion to the Tennessee Smokies of the Class AA Southern League in July, with whom he finished the season; over 17 starts with both clubs, he pitched to a 5–6 record with a 4.55 ERA, compiling 76 strikeouts over 91 innings. Following the season, he was selected to play in the Arizona Fall League with the Mesa Solar Sox.

Uelmen did not play a minor league game in 2020 due to the cancellation of the minor league season caused by the COVID-19 pandemic. He returned to the Smokies (now members of the Double-A South to begin the 2021 season. He moved into the bullpen during the season, and earned a promotion to the Iowa Cubs of the Triple-A East in mid-August. Over 31 games (11 starts) between the two teams, Uelmen went 2–9 with a 5.78 ERA and 88 strikeouts over  innings. He returned to Iowa to begin the 2022 season. 

On July 17, 2022, the Cubs selected Uelmen's contract and promoted him to the major leagues. He made his MLB debut on July 22 at Wrigley Field versus the Philadelphia Phillies pitching one inning in relief, giving up one run while striking out a batter. He was designated for assignment on December 24, 2022.

Philadelphia Phillies
On January 4, 2023, Uelmen was traded to the Philadelphia Phillies in exchange for cash considerations.

References

External links

Cal Poly bio

1996 births
Living people
Baseball players from Nevada
Cal Poly Mustangs baseball players
Chicago Cubs players
Eugene Emeralds players
Iowa Cubs players
Major League Baseball pitchers
Mesa Solar Sox players
Myrtle Beach Pelicans players
South Bend Cubs players
Sportspeople from Las Vegas
Tennessee Smokies players
Yarmouth–Dennis Red Sox players
Eau Claire Express players